Andres Kollist (born 30 January 1948 in Tartu) is an Estonian chemist, librarian, politician and activist.

In 1971 he graduated from Tartu State University in chemistry. After graduating he worked at Estonian SSR Academy of Sciences.

His main field of research has been polygalactanes in red algae.

1989-1993 and since 2008 he is a member of Tallinn City Council. 1995-2000 he was the CEO of Citizenship and Migration Board. 2000-2001 he was the rector of Audentes Higher Business School. Since 2004 he is the head of Tallinn University Academic Library.

Awards:
 2001: Order of the White Star, V class.

Works

 A. Kollist, M. Vaher, J. Paris, T. Püssa. Characterization and utilization of polysaccharides isolated from agar-containing algae. 4. The effect of concentration, determining temperature and storage time on the gel strength of some agars. – Eesti NSV Teaduste Akadeemia Toimetised. Keemia, 29, 1980
 A. Kollist, M. Vaher, K. Truus, J. Paris, T. Püssa. Characterization and utilization of polysaccharides isolated from agar-containing algae. – Tokyo, 1989
 R. Tuvikene, K. Truus, M. Robal, O. Volobujeva, E. Mellikov, T. Pehk, A. Kollist, K. Tiiu, M. Vaher. The extraction, structure, and gelling properties of hybrid galactan from the red alga Furcellaria lumbricalis (Baltic Sea, Estonia). – Journal of Applied Phycology 2010, 22(1)
 K-R. Kont, A. Kollist, S. Jantson. Financing of Estonian Research Libraries: The Happy Days and the Economic Crisis. – Slavic and East European Information Resources 2012, 13(1)

References

Living people
1948 births
Estonian chemists
Estonian Centre Party politicians
University of Tartu alumni
Academic staff of Tallinn University
Recipients of the Order of the White Star, 5th Class
People from Tartu
Politicians from Tartu